King Dinosaur is a 1955 science fiction film starring William Bryant and Wanda Curtis with narration by Marvin Miller. It was co-written, produced, and directed by Bert I. Gordon, in his directorial debut. The film was featured on season 2 of Mystery Science Theater 3000.

Plot
Five years in the future (1960), four scientists (zoologist Dr. Richard Gordon, geologist Dr. Nora Pierce, medical specialist Dr. Ralph Martin, and chemist Dr. Patrica Bennett) are selected as astronauts to travel to an ancient planet called Nova that has just entered Earth's Solar System. The crew begins studying the planet to see if it is suitable for a possible Earth colony. After first discovering normal Earth animals such as a kinkajou which they refer to as a lemur, crows which they call vultures, and an alligator (A Prehistoric species called Diplocynodon), they soon encounter and battle giant insects, an enormous snake known as Gigantophis, and prehistoric mammals like a Cave Bear, a Mastodon, and a Glyptodont.

Richard and Nora paddle a raft out to an island and are trapped in a cave by Prehistoric Reptiles, even a Giant Monster-sized green iguana coaxed to stand on its hind legs. They fire off a signal flare. Back on the mainland near their spaceship, Ralph and Patricia see the distress signal, grab the auxiliary nuclear power supply and paddle their raft out to the island to rescue Richard and Nora. Before they leave the island, they set the power supply to "unharness" in 30 minutes and leave it on the island. After encountering more prehistoric creatures, they reach their spaceship. The power supply blows up the island in a nuclear mushroom cloud, rendering King Dinosaur and the other dinosaurs of Nova extinct.

Cast
 William Bryant – Dr. Ralph Martin
 Wanda Curtis – Dr. Patricia Bennett
 Douglas Henderson – Dr. Richard Gordon
 Patti Gallagher – Nora Pierce
 Marvin Miller – Narrator

Production
Filming started in September 1954.

The film was directed over a seven-day period by Bert I. Gordon and was Gordon's debut. The camera and other pieces of equipment were borrowed and the cast worked for deferred salaries.

The scene of the attacking mammoth was stock footage recycled from the film One Million B.C..

There were only four actors in this film. The rest of the band and soldiers were just military stock footage, as was the footage of the atomic bomb explosions.

Mystery Science Theater 3000

The film was featured in a second-season episode of Mystery Science Theater 3000 in December 1990.

Reception

TV Guide gave the movie one out of five stars, stating that the quickness of the movie shooting shows. Film historian Leonard Maltin rated the movie 0 of 4 stars, describing it as "First and worst of director Gordon's many 1950s sci-fi films .... Boring, silly, and awesomely cheap ...."

References

External links 

 
 
 
 

1955 films
1950s monster movies
1950s science fiction films
Giant monster films
Films about astronauts
Films about extraterrestrial life
Films about dinosaurs
American black-and-white films
Films directed by Bert I. Gordon
Lippert Pictures films
Films set in 1960
Films set in the future
Films set on fictional islands
Films set on fictional planets
1950s English-language films
American science fiction films